Pierre-Julien Gilbert (1783 in Brest – 1860 in Brest) was a French painter who specialised in naval scenes.

Gilbert was a pupil of Pierre Ozanne and Louis-Philippe Crépin. He taught painting at the École Navale from 1816, and was admitted to accompany the Navy during the Invasion of Algiers in 1830.

Gilbert was professor of drawing at the Naval School of Brest.

Sources and references

 Pierre-Julien Gilbert
 Joconde database

19th-century French painters
French male painters
1783 births
1860 deaths
19th-century French male artists